Aaron Albert Carr (born 1963) is a Laguna Pueblo/Navajo documentary film maker and author. His first novel, published in 1995, Eye Killers was described as "Dracula-meets-Geronimo," and combines elements of European vampire legend with Monster Slayer of Native American Myth.

References
Kratzert, M. "Native American Literature: Expanding the Canon", Collection Building Vol. 17, 1, 1998, p. 4

Laguna Pueblo
Navajo writers
1963 births
Living people
Place of birth missing (living people)
Date of birth missing (living people)
20th-century American writers